Main Street is a major north–south thoroughfare in Los Angeles, California. It serves as the east–west postal divider for the city and the county as well.

Route 

From the northeast, Main Street begins as a continuation of Valley Boulevard west of Mission Road in Lincoln Heights as 'North Main Street'. 

Main Street enters Downtown Los Angeles passing by the edge of the Los Angeles Plaza. It continues through the Civic Center area, which is built on top of the site of the buildings — nearly all demolished — that in the 1880s through 1900s formed the city's Central Business District. At 3rd Street it enters the Historic Core district. At 9th Street, it merges with Spring Street in Downtown LA, and between Cesar E. Chavez Avenue and 9th Street, Main Street shares a one-way couplet with Spring Street.  

In Wilmington Main Street moniker ends, the street continuing on as Wilmington Boulevard.

Building and sites north of US-101
 Lincoln Park
 Los Angeles Plaza Historic District

Buildings and sites from US-101 to Third Street

Buildings and sites south of Third Street

Sources include the Clason map of Downtown Los Angeles:

300 block
On the west side of Main St. south of 3rd Street were:
 #311–317 - Round House (demolished)
 300 block west side - site of Belasco Theatre

On the east side of Main St. south of 3rd Street were:
Panorama Building, 312–324 S. Main (post-1890 numbering), with retail shops and offices such as the Olmsted & Wales Panorama bookstore and the Los Angeles Evening Express offices. In the center of the building was a passage to the back and an exhibition space for a panoramic painting, debuting in late 1887: a copy of the Panorama of the Siege of Paris by Henri Felix Emmanuel Philippoteaux, depicting a battle of the 1870-71 Franco-Prussian war-- the last one between the French resistance and Prussian besiegers, which led to the fall of Paris in January, 1871. When attendance dwindled, investors (including local landowner and capitalist Daniel Freeman) sold the painting to buyers in San Francisco and the rotunda housed at various times the Empire Stables and "Panorama Stables', with stalls for horses in the former exhibition space., in 1906 it was transformed into a state-of-the-art roller skating rink, which was unsuccessful. Owner Adolph Ramish demolished the building in 1907 and the Adolphus (later Hippodrome) Theatre was built on the site. Today the site is a large open-air parking lot.
Hotel Westminster at the end of the block, northeast corner of Fourth and Main.

4th and Main

 NW corner 4th/Main - Hotel Barclay
 NE corner 4th Main - site of Hotel Westminster, now site of Medallion Apartments
 #400–410 (SE corner of 4th/Main) - San Fernando Building
 #401 (SW corner of 4th/Main) - Farmers and Merchants Bank of Los Angeles building (former)
 #403–411 S. Main, entrance also on 124 W. 4th, Isaias W. Hellman Building (1912-5, Morgan, Walls and Morgan). Not to be confused with the Hellman Building on Spring Street nearby.
 #420–426 (NE corner of Winston): site of Main Street Savings Bank Building, demolished
 #430 (SE corner of Winston, approximate numbering): Federal Building or Government Building, demolished. The Post Office moved here in June 1893 from 6th and Broadway.
 #443: site of Lexington Hotel

5th and Main
 NW corner 5th/Main - former Rosslyn Hotel main building, now The Rosslyn lofts
 112 W. 5th (SW corner 5th/Main) Hotel Rosslyn Annex
 SE corner 5th/Main former Charnock Block a.k.a. Pershing Hotel and Roma Hotel (508 S. Main), now New Pershing Apartments, last original two-story 19th-century commercial block left in the Historic Core. The Charnock Block was constructed in two phases, the 5th St. face in 1889 and the Main St. face in 1907. In 1923, it became the Pershing Hotel. It is a rare example of Late Victorian-era commercial architecture and Second Empire architecture still existing in the Historic Core. The Roma was built in 1904 by Fred L. and Frank M. Lee. In 1989, both buildings were joined and renovated and are now apartments; they are contributing buildings to the "5th-Main Street Commercial Historic District", National Register of Historic Places (eligible 2007).
 Burbank Theatre, 548 S. Main, opened 1893, closed 1974, demolished. Now the site of the Topaz Apartments at #550.

6th and Main
 NW corner 6th/Main - site of Severance Building
 NE corner of 6th/Main, #558–564, Santa Fe Lofts also knows as the Kerckoff Building, built 1908, former offices of the Atchison, Topeka and Santa Fe Railroad
 SW corner 6th/Main, site of Central Building
 SE corner 6th/Main, #610, Pacific Electric Building, former main station for interurban streetcars of the Pacific Electric Railway
 #640 Hotel Cecil, 14 stories

7th and Main
 #700 Former Dearden's department store building, under renovation
 7th to Washington: L.A. Fashion District

8th and Main
 NW corner 8th/Main, Great Republic Building, now Great Republic lofts (entrance on Spring Street)
 SW corner 8th/Main, National City Building, now National City Tower lofts
 SE corner 8th/Main Hotel Huntington Building, now Huntington Apartments
 #810, site of California Theatre (opened 1918, closed 19987, demolished 1990) and 
 #842 site of the Miller Theatre (opened 1913, originally 714 seats, later 924, demolished)

9th and Main
 NW corner of 9th/Main, W. M. Garland Building
 SW corner of 9th/Main Marsh & Strong Building

Theaters on Main Street

While the Broadway Theater and Commercial District several blocks west is famous enough to warrant constituting a National Register-listed historic district, Main Street was home to dozens of theatres and early cinemas as well. The peak era was the early 1910s, before the more upscale cinema market migrated west to Broadway. There were 27 theaters and cinemas running on Main in 1912. In 1939 there were still 18 operating between 2nd and 9th streets.
Art Theatre, 551 S. Main St.
Banner Theatre, 458 S. Main St. 
Bijou Theatre, 553 S. Main St. 
Burbank Theatre, 548 S. Main St. 
California Theatre, 810 S. Main St. 
Clune's Theatre, 453 S. Main St. 
Crystal Theatre, 247 S. Main St. 
Denver Theatre, 238 S. Main St. 
Dohs Theatre, 166 N. Main St.
The Downtown Independent, 251 S. Main St. 
Electric Theatre, 262 S. Main St. 
Estella Theatre, 515 N. Main St. 
Federal Theatre, 300 N. Main St. 
Follies Theatre, 337 S. Main St. 
Galway Theatre, 514 S. Main St. 
Gayety Theatre, 523 S. Main St. 
Gem Theatre, 649 S. Main St.  
Grand Opera House, 110 S. Main St. (a.k.a. Orpheum Theatre, which changed venues over the years) 
Happy Hour Theatre, 125 S. Main St. 
Hippodrome Theatre, 320 S. Main St. 
Jade Theatre, 315 S. Main St. 
Lark Theatre, 613 S. Main St. 
Liberty Theatre, 266 S. Main St. 
Linda Lea Theatre, 251 S. Main St. 
Main Theatre, 438 S. Main St. 
Merced Theatre, 420 N. Main St. 
Miller's Theatre, 842 S. Main St.   
Mott's Hall, 133 S. Main St. 
Muse Theatre, 417 S. Main St. 
Nickel Theatre, 255 S. Main St. 
Novelty Theatre, 136 S. Main St. 
Olvera St. Theatre, W-10 Olvera St. / 620 N. Main St. 
Optic Theatre, 533 S. Main St. 
People's Amphitheater, N. Main St. near 1st  
Picture Theatre, 545 S. Main St. 
Playo Theatre, 349 N. Main St. 
Plaza Theatre, 224 N. Main St. 
Princess Theatre, 121 W. 1st St. 
Principal Theatre, 433 N. Main St. 
Regal Theatre, 323 S. Main St.  
Regent Theatre, 448 S. Main St. 
Republic Theatre, 629 1/2 S. Main St. 
Rex Theatre, 324 S. Main St. 
Roosevelt Theatre, 212 N. Main St. 
Rosslyn Theatre, 431 S. Main St. 
Rounder Theatre, 510 S. Main St.
Sherman Theatre, 518 S. Main St. 
Star Theatre, 529 S. Main St.
Star Theatre, 100 block of E. 5th St.
Stearns Hall, SE corner N. Main St. and Arcadia St.
Tally's Phonograph and Vitascope Parlor, 137 S. Main St. 
Teatro Hidalgo, 373 N. Main St. 
Teatro Torito, W-12 Olvera St. / 622 N. Main St. 
Temple Theatre, 155 N. Main St.
Victor Theatre, 1718 S. Main St.
Wood's Opera House, 410 N. Main St.

Transportation
Main Street carries Metro Local lines: 10, 33, 48, 55, 76, and 92; most of those lines run on Main Street in downtown only, while Line 76 serves Main Street in Northeast Los Angeles and Line 48 in South Los Angeles.

References

Streets in Los Angeles
Streets in Los Angeles County, California
Downtown Los Angeles
Chinatown, Los Angeles
Civic Center, Los Angeles
Lincoln Heights, Los Angeles
South Los Angeles